Chauncey may refer to:

Chauncey (name), both a given name and a surname.

Places in the United States
 Chauncey, Georgia
 Chauncey, Illinois
 Chauncey, Michigan
 Chauncey, Ohio
 Chauncey, West Virginia
 Chauncey Peak, a mountain near Meriden, Connecticut
 Chauncey Street station, of the New York City Subway
 Chauncey, a 19th-century town absorbed into West Lafayette, Indiana

Other uses
 Chauncey (Wonder Showzen character), puppet on the American TV series
 USS Chauncey, three ships named for Commodore Chauncey

See also
 
 
 Chauncy (disambiguation)
 Chauncy (name)
 Chauncey Vibbard (steamboat)